John Edward Ogilvie (12 September 1931 – 17 April 2021) was a New Zealand cricketer. He played in five first-class matches for Wellington from 1954 to 1964.

Ogilvie died in Lower Hutt on 17 April 2021.

See also
 List of Wellington representative cricketers

References

External links
 

1931 births
2021 deaths
New Zealand cricketers
Wellington cricketers
Cricketers from Lower Hutt